The Amateur Football Alliance Senior Cup is an amateur football competition in England organised by the Amateur Football Alliance. The competition is contested by the first teams of clubs affiliated to the Alliance.

External links
Official website

Football cup competitions in England
Amateur association football